Olympic FC is an Australian soccer team based in Brisbane.

Olympic FC may also refer to:
Olympic F.C., a defunct football club from London
Adelaide Olympic FC, a soccer club based in Adelaide, Australia
Canberra Olympic FC, a soccer club in Canberra, Australia
Darwin Olympic SC, a soccer club in Darwin, Australia
Hamilton Olympic FC, a soccer club in Newcastle, Australia
Hobart Olympic, a previous name used by Olympia FC Warriors, a soccer club in Hobart, Australia
Olympic Kingsway SC, a soccer club in Perth, Australia
Olympic FC de Niamey, a football club in Niger
Radcliffe Olympic F.C., a football club in Nottinghamshire, England
Riverside Olympic FC, a soccer club in Launceston, Australia
Sydney Olympic FC, a soccer club in Sydney, Australia

See also
Olympia FC (disambiguation)
List of Greek Soccer clubs in Australia